The Diana and Actaeon basin or Basin with Scenes from the Myth of Diana and Actaeon is a 1613 silver bowl produced by the Dutch silversmith Paul van Vianen. It shows scenes from the myth of Diana and Actaeon, with a border in the Auricular style. It is in the collection of the Rijksmuseum in Amsterdam, which acquired it in 1947.

References

1613 works
Collections of the Rijksmuseum Amsterdam
Artemis in art
Bathing in art
Silver objects